Katalin is a feminine given name and is a Hungarian variant from Catherine. Notable people with the name include:

 Katalin Bánffy Hungarian noblewoman
 Kata Bethlen (1700–1759) Hungarian writer, sometimes known in English as Katherine Bethlen 
 Katalin Bogyay (born 1956) President of the General Conference of UNESCO 
 Katalin Cseh (born 1988) Canadian-born Hungarian physician and politician
 Katalin Csőke (1957–2017) Hungarian discus thrower
 Katalin Divós (born 1974) Hungarian female hammer thrower 
 Katalin Eichler-Schadek (born 1940) Hungarian volleyball player
 Katalin Juhász (born 1932) Olympic gold medalist of Hungary
 Katalin Karády (1910-1990) as a Hungarian actress and singer
 Katalin Kariko (born 1955) Hungarian scientist who, with Drew Weissman, developed the technology behind the COVID-19 mRNA vaccines
 Katalin Kovács (born 1976) Olympic medalist of Hungary
 Katalin Laki (born 1948) Hungarian handball player
 Katalin Lévai (born 1954) Hungarian politician and Member of the European Parliament
 Katalin Makray (born 1945)  Hungarian former gymnast 
 Katalin Marosi (born 1979)  Hungarian professional tennis player
 Katalin Nagy (born 1979)  Hungarian ultramarathon runner
 Katalin Novák (born 1977)  Hungarian politician, Minister of State for Family, Youth and International Affairs
 Katalin Pálinger (born 1978)  former Hungarian international team handball goalkeeper
 Katalin Szabó (born 1967) Romanian artistic gymnast
 Katalin Szili (born 1956) Speakers of the National Assembly of Hungary
 Katalin Szőke (born 1935) is a Hungarian swimmer and Olympic champion
 Katalin Vad (born 1980) Hungarian female pornographic film actress
 Katalin zu Windisch-Graetz (born 1947)  Hungarian aristocrat and designer
 Katalin Zamiar (born 1971) is a Cuban American martial artist, sportswriter and actress
 Catherine of Hungary, Queen of Serbia (1256–1314) daughter of Stephen V of Hungary
 Catherine of Hungary, Duchess of Świdnica (1338–1343 or 1345-1355) daughter of Charles I of Hungary
 Catherine of Hungary (1370–1378) (1370–1378) daughter of King Louis the Great

Feminine given names
Hungarian feminine given names